Putney Swope is a 1969 American satirical comedy film written and directed by Robert Downey Sr., and starring Arnold Johnson as the title character, a black advertising executive. The film satirizes the advertising world, the portrayal of race in Hollywood films and the nature of corporate corruption.

In 2016, the film was selected for preservation in the United States National Film Registry by the Library of Congress as being "culturally, historically, or aesthetically significant".

Plot
Putney Swope (Arnold Johnson, voiced by Robert Downey Sr.), the only black man on the executive board of an advertising firm, is accidentally put in charge after the sudden death of the chairman of the board. Prevented by the company by-laws from voting for themselves, board members vote by secret ballot for the one person they thought could not win: Putney Swope.

Renaming the business "Truth and Soul, Inc.", Swope replaces all but one of the white employees with black employees and insists they no longer accept business from companies that produce alcohol, tobacco or toy guns. Throughout the movie, a series of bizzare, surreal ads for breakfast cereal, air conditioners, skin cream, and airliners are shown, often featuring obscenity or nudity. Swope's leadership style is eccentric and erratic, with him frequently firing employees after taking their ideas. 

The success of the business draws attention from the United States government and the President (Pepi Hermine), who is in the pocket of the owner of the "Borman Six", an automobile company. The president orders Swope to create an advertisement for their new automobile. Swope attempts to create an advertisement, but it goes poorly when the overweight actress tips the car over and crashes it. Incensed, the president of the Bowman Six demands it not be put on TV, but Swope refuses and airs it anyway. 

Afterwards, Truth & Soul is swarmed with demonstrators, protesting the vulgarity and obscenity of Truth and Soul's advertisements. The president meets with Swope (dressed as Fidel Castro), who tells Swope it is "discrimination" to not advertise alcohol, cigaretts, or toy guns, and that the demonstrations will continue unless he relents. 

In a board meeting, Swope tells the board that they will begin creating advertisements for alcohol, cigarettes, and toy guns, to which the members of the board are outraged and accuse him of selling out. Swope later mentions to his bodyguard that this was a test to see if his followers would stick to their ideals. He orders his guards to split up the company's money evenly to everyone, except to the Arab (who has been critical of Swope's leadership throughout the film). The board members return to Swope and say they have changed their mind, and are happy to advertise whatever he wants to sell. Disillusioned, Swope silently walks away, leaving them to squabble over a glass bin full of the company's money. The Arab, upon finding out he is not receiving any, sets the money on fire with a Molotov cocktail, which burns as the credits role.

Production
In a DVD interview, Downey claims that Johnson had great difficulty memorizing and giving his lines during filming. Downey says he was unconcerned as he had developed a plan to dub his own voice over Johnson's.

Though the film is in black-and-white, the Truth and Soul commercials are in color.

Cast
(as listed in the end credits by order of appearance)
 Stan Gottlieb as Nathan (as Stanley Gottlieb)
 Allen Garfield as Elias, Jr.
 Archie Russell as Joker
 Ramon Gordon as Bissinger
 Bert Lawrence as Hawker
 Joe Madden as Mr. Syllables (credited as Joe Engler)
 Arnold Johnson as Putney Swope
 David Kirk as Elias, Sr.
 Don George as Mr. Cards
 Buddy Butler as Putney's Bodyguard
 Vincent Hamill as Man in White Suit
 Tom Odachi as Wing Soney
 Ching Yeh as Wing Soney, Jr.
 Spunky-Funk Johnson	as Mr. Major
 Joe Fields as Pittsburgh Willie
 Norman Schreiber as Messenger
 Robert Staats as Mr. War Toys
 Mel Brooks as Mr. Forget It
 Antonio Fargas as The Arab (first credited screen role)

Release

Poster controversy
The theatrical release poster showed a raised hand with the image of a girl replacing the out-thrust middle finger. The Los Angeles Times declined to print the advertisement, and it was not reprinted by the Los Angeles Herald Examiner after initial complaints. In Chicago, the Tribune and Today refused to publish it, and it was pulled by the Sun-Times and Daily News, although they later published the advertisement without the girl as the middle finger. Roger Ebert was embarrassed by the Sun-Times censorship.

Box office
Putney Swope opened on July 10, 1969, at Cinema II in New York City, grossing $32,281 in its first week. The film opened in Los Angeles on January 21, 1970, and set a house record of $16,000 at the 3 Penny Cinema in Chicago when it opened in February 1970; and, in Los Angeles, it was felt that the controversy boosted public interest.

Home media
The film was released on DVD on May 22, 2001, by Rhino Home Video. It received a Blu-ray on July 2, 2019, by Vinegar Syndrome.

Legacy
The character Buck Swope from Paul Thomas Anderson's Boogie Nights (1997), portrayed by Don Cheadle, was named as a homage to this film. Downey also made a small cameo in Boogie Nights as the owner of a recording studio. The character Wing Soney, a Chinese businessman, was the inspiration for Cosmo, the Chinese man throwing firecrackers during the drug deal scene.

Anderson, Louis C.K. and Jim Jarmusch have cited Putney Swope as an inspiration for their approach to filmmaking.

The Beastie Boys song "Shadrach", from their 1989 album Paul's Boutique, mentions the film in the lyric "Music for all and not just one people, and now we're gonna bust with the Putney Swope sequel". Film dialogue is sampled on De La Soul's 1989 song "The Magic Number", as well as The Avalanches' 2016 album Wildflower.

A black-and-white photo of the film's poster, which Sloan band member Jay Ferguson saw in a book, inspired the "quick and photocopy looking" look of the album cover for the band's 1999 album Between the Bridges.

Putney Swope was preserved by the Academy Film Archive in 2019. It is currently available to stream on Peacock.

References

External links

1969 films
1969 comedy films
American black-and-white films
American business films
American comedy films
American satirical films
Films about advertising
Films about businesspeople
Films about race and ethnicity
Films directed by Robert Downey Sr.
Films set in New York City
Films with screenplays by Robert Downey Sr.
United States National Film Registry films
1960s English-language films
1960s American films